The prime minister of Haiti (French:) is the head of government of Haiti. The office was created under the 1987 Constitution; previously, all executive power was held by the president or head of state, who appointed and chaired the Council of Ministers. The office is currently vacant, with Ariel Henry having been sworn in as acting prime minister on 20 July 2021.

Appointment
The prime minister is appointed by the president and ratified by the National Assembly.

Duties and powers
The prime minister appoints the ministers and secretaries of state, and goes before the National Assembly to obtain a vote of confidence for their declaration of general policy. The prime minister enforces the laws and, along with the president, is responsible for national defense. In addition, the prime minister oversees the National Commission on Government Procurement (CNMP), a decentralized body.

Records
Gérard Latortue served the longest time in office, serving 1,550 days in office. Jacques-Édouard Alexis served the second-longest time in office, serving 1,526 total days during his two terms in office, and he was the longest-serving prime minister appointed to the position by an elected president.

See also
List of prime ministers of Haiti
President of Haiti
List of heads of state of Haiti

References
 Notes
 Footnotes